The Vaslui is a left tributary of the river Bârlad in Romania. It discharges into the Bârlad south of the city Vaslui. The Solești Dam is located on this river.

Towns and villages

The following towns and villages are situated along the river Vaslui, from source to mouth: Schitu Duca, Coropceni, Ciortești, Solești, Văleni, Vaslui and Muntenii de Jos.

Tributaries

The following rivers are tributaries to the river Vaslui (from source to mouth):

Left: Coropceni, Ciortești, Rac (Chircești)
Right: Cărbunăria, Tabăra, Pocreaca, Dobrovăț, Lunca, Glod, Ferești, Munteni, Delea

References

Rivers of Romania
Rivers of Iași County
Rivers of Vaslui County